Tupperware station is a train station in the community of Hunter's Creek, Florida. It is located along the southern phase of SunRail, the commuter rail service of Greater Orlando, and opened for revenue service on July 30, 2018. The station is named after the nearby Tupperware Brands Corporation headquarters campus.

References

Railway stations in the United States opened in 2018
SunRail stations
Greater Orlando